The National Strawberry Festival in Belleville, Michigan, established in 1977, began as a way for local farmers to celebrate their strawberry crops. Taking place over three days, held the third weekend in June, the festival offers many events for people of all ages. In collaboration with area churches and schools, some of the events include:

 Bingo
 Strawberry desserts
 Parade
 Car show
 "Strawberry Queen Pageant"
 Live entertainment

Each year the festival attracts over 200,000 people from Southeastern Michigan and farther.

This festival went on hiatus in 2020-21 caused by the COVID-19 pandemic and  resumed in 2022.

See also
 List of strawberry topics

References

External links
National Strawberry Festival Official Website

Food and drink festivals in the United States
Festivals in Michigan
Tourist attractions in Wayne County, Michigan
Strawberry festivals